Swarb's Lazarus, or just Lazarus were an English folk band formed by Dave Swarbrick ("Swarb") (fiddle, mandolin, vocals) with ex-Whippersnapper Kevin Dempsey (guitar, vocals) and ex-Fairport Maartin Allcock (multi-instrumentalist, vocals). They have released one album - Live and Kicking (2006), a compilation of live recordings made in April and May 2006, which has received critical approval.

The instrumental track The Brilliancy Medley And The Cherokee Shuffle was included on the Folk Awards 2007 Box Set 

The band's name is an ironic reference to Swarbrick having his obituary published some years before.

References

English folk musical groups
Musical groups established in 2006
Musical groups disestablished in 2009
2006 establishments in England
2009 disestablishments in England